Yulong Town is a town under the administration of Xingyang, Zhengzhou, Henan. In 2015, the Provincial and Local Economic and Social Survey Team named Yulong number 2 of the top 100 towns in Henan.

Administrative divisions 

Yulong Town contains three communities and 28 villages:

Wanye Community (万业社区), Tanshan Community (檀山社区), Ningshan Community (宁山社区), Ershilipu Village (二十里铺村), Xizhangzhai Village (西张砦村), Zhaizhai Village (​翟砦村), Nianxu Village (​碾徐村), Fanzhai Village (樊砦村), Shiyuan Village (​柿园村), ​Huaixi Village (槐西村), Chuzhai Village (​楚寨村), Wangzhai Village (​王寨村), Zhaojiadong Village (​赵家垌村), Jingxiangcheng Village (京襄城村), Nanzhangzhai Village (​南张寨村), Haozhai Village (​郝寨村), Xingguosi Village (兴国寺村), Wawusun Village (​瓦屋孙村), Shizhugang Village (​石柱岗村), Zhaojiazhuang Village (​赵家庄村), Chenzhuang Village (​陈庄村), Guandimiao Village (​关帝庙村), Jiangzhai Village (​蒋寨村), Luodong Village (​罗垌村), Ruzhai Village (​茹寨村), Maozhai Village (​毛寨村), Zhaiyang Village (寨杨村), ​Yanqu Village (晏曲村), Jiaozhai Village (焦寨村), Liu Village (​刘村), and Heizhang Village (黑张村).

References 

Towns in China
Zhengzhou